Baron Paul Davidovich or Pavle Davidović (1737, Buda – 18 February 1814, Komárom) became a general of the Austrian Empire and a Knight of the Military Order of Maria Theresa. He played a major role in the 1796 Italian campaign during the French Revolutionary Wars, leading corps-sized commands in the fighting against the French army led by Napoleon Bonaparte. He led troops during the Napoleonic Wars and was Proprietor (Inhaber) of an Austrian infantry regiment.

Early career
Born in Buda (Ofen) (in modern-day Budapest, Hungary) in 1737, Davidovich came from a Serb family which had immigrated to the Austrian Empire from the Ottoman Empire at the time of Emperor Leopold I. In 1757, Davidovich joined the Austrian army's Ferdinand Karl Infantry Regiment #2. He served during the Seven Years' War and rose in rank to Captain. In 1771, he received promotion to Major in d'Alton Infantry Regiment #19. He performed heroically under fire at Bystrzyca Kłodzka (Habelschwerdt) in January 1779 during the War of the Bavarian Succession. This action earned him the Knight's Cross of the Military Order of Maria Theresa. He was rewarded with the noble rank of Freiherr in 1780. The following year, he became Oberst-Leutnant of the Esterhazy Infantry Regiment #34. He earned promotion to Oberst (colonel) of the Peterwardeiner Grenz infantry regiment in 1783.

During the Austro-Turkish War, Davidovich talked the Turkish governor of Šabac into surrendering in 1788. He assisted Maximilian Baillet de Latour in stamping out the 1789 Belgian revolt and was elevated to the rank of General-Major in 1790.

French Revolutionary Wars
In 1793 during the War of the First Coalition, he distinguished himself in the battles of Neerwinden and Wattignies. He participated in the Flanders campaign in 1794 under Prince Josias of Saxe-Coburg-Saalfeld. He served under Dagobert Sigmund von Wurmser in the successful Siege of Mannheim which capitulated on 22 November 1795. He was promoted to Feldmarschal-Leutnant in March 1796.

During the spring of 1796, Napoleon's French army overran the Kingdom of Sardinia-Piedmont and the Duchy of Milan, and began the Siege of Mantua. In July, Davidovich transferred to the Italian theater and was placed under Wurmser's command. During the first relief of Mantua, he commanded the Left-Center (III) Column, which included the brigades of Anton Mittrowsky, Anton Lipthay, and Leberecht Spiegel. The force numbered 8,274 infantry, 1,618 cavalry, and 40 cannon. He fought at the Battle of Castiglione on 5 August.

In the second relief of Mantua, Wurmser and his chief-of-staff Franz von Lauer planned to transfer major elements of the army from the upper Adige valley to Bassano del Grappa via the Brenta valley. They assigned Davidovich to hold the Adige valley with 13,500 soldiers in the brigades of the Prince of Reuss, Josef Vukassovich, and Johann Sporck. Lauer believed that the French army would remain passive during the operation. Defying expectations, Bonaparte attacked Davidovich with 30,000 men. In the Battle of Rovereto on 4 September, the French swamped the Austrian defenses, inflicted 3,000 casualties, captured Trento, and pushed Davidovich north beyond Lavis. Bonaparte soon won the Battle of Bassano and drove Wurmser and 12,000 men within the fortress of Mantua.

For the third relief of Mantua, Emperor Francis II appointed József Alvinczi commander of a newly formed army. Alvinczi planned to advance on Mantua from the east with 28,000 soldiers while Davidovich and 19,500 troops moved from the Adige valley in the north. Davidovich's Tyrol Corps comprised the brigades of Sporck, Vukassovich, Johann Laudon, and Joseph Ocskay, plus a small reserve. After a bloody clash at Cembra on 2 November, he recaptured Trento. He routed Claude Vaubois' outnumbered French division at the Battle of Calliano on 7 November. Despite being urged by Alvinczi to attack again, he proved very slow to follow up his success. One reason was the 3,500 casualties suffered at Cembra and Calliano. Other difficulties included a false report that placed André Masséna's division in his front, heavy snow in the mountains, and the fact that messages took two days to arrive from Alvinczi. He routed Vaubois again at Rivoli Veronese on 17 November, but this victory came two days too late. After the French defeated Alvinczi on 15–17 November at the Battle of Arcole, Bonaparte turned on Davidovich in great strength. The French beat him in a second clash at Rivoli on 22 November. With Davidovich's corps in flight northward, Alvinczi was forced to abandon the campaign.

Napoleonic Wars
In 1804, he became the proprietor of Davidovich Infantry Regiment #34, a Hungarian unit, and held this position until his death. When the War of the Third Coalition broke out, he commanded part of Archduke Charles' army in Italy. During the Battle of Caldiero on 29–31 October 1805, he led the nine infantry battalions, eight cavalry squadrons, and 26 artillery pieces of the left-wing. After the war, he served as deputy (Adlatus) to the commanding general in Slavonia. He inspected fortresses in Serbia and received a promotion to Feldzeugmeister in 1807. In his last active command, he led a division of Hungarian insurrection militia at the Battle of Raab on 14 June 1809 during the War of the Fifth Coalition. He died on 18 February 1814 at Komárno when he was governor of that fortress.

See also
 Paul von Radivojevich
 Martin von Dedovich
 Andreas Karaczay (Andrija Karadžić)
 Arsenije Sečujac
 Karl Paul von Quosdanovich
 Peter Vitus von Quosdanovich
 Mathias Rukavina von Boynograd
 Joseph Philipp Vukassovich
 Franjo Vlašić
 Gavrilo Rodić
 Adam Bajalics von Bajahaza
 Josif Šišković

Notes

References
.

Further reading
 Chandler, David. The Campaigns of Napoleon. New York: Macmillan, 1966.

Austrian soldiers
Austrian generals
Serbian soldiers
Austrian Empire military leaders of the French Revolutionary Wars
Military leaders of the French Revolutionary Wars
Austrian Empire commanders of the Napoleonic Wars
Serbs of Hungary
Military personnel from Budapest
1737 births
1814 deaths
Generals of the Holy Roman Empire